Gunnar Fougner (January 5, 1911 – October 20, 1995) was a Norwegian architect.

Gunnar Fougner was born in Lillehammer, Norway. He attended the Norwegian Institute of Technology in Trondheim where he graduated in 1934. Fougner began his first job as an assistant architect working for Ove Bang 1935–1938, followed by employment by Arne Korsmo in 1939.

He was an active resistance fighter during the Nazi occupation of Norway. Fougner left Norway in July 1940  to join a Norwegian group of special troops. Among other activities, he assisted in the transport of resistance fighters between Norway and Shetland. During the liberation of Norway, he was in a group under Major Leiv Kreyberg  who led the liberation of  Allies POWs in North Norway.

After World War II, he entered private practice in Lillehammer. He would later enter  into partnership with Einar Myklebust. During the period 1955–1966,  they won a number of major competitions. They completed the design of both the Munch Museum in Oslo, (1953–63)) and the Institute of Odontology in Bergen (1955–63).

References

Other sources
Nansen, Liv  (2002) Gunnar Fougner. En arkitekt

Related reading
Aas, Oddvar (1980) Norske penneknekter i eksil: en beretning om Stockholms-legasjonens (pressekontor under krigen) (Oslo: Tiden)     
O'Connor, Bernard (2014)  Sabotage in Norway (Lulu Press, Inc.)  
Ulstein, Ragnar (1989) Etterretningstjenesten i Norge 1940-45 (Oslo: Cappelen)  

1911 births
1995 deaths
People from Lillehammer
Norwegian resistance members
20th-century Norwegian architects